The INAS 316 is an Indian naval air squadron based at INS Hansa. The squadron was commissioned by Chief of Naval Staff R. Hari Kumar on 29 March 2022.

The squadron is currently operational under the Western Naval Command.

History
The squadron is equipped with  P-8I Neptune and was commissioned on 29 March 2022 by   Chief of Naval Staff R. Hari Kumar at INS Hansa, Goa.

The squadron is primarily tasked with maritime reconnaissance, ELINT, coastal surveillance.

References

Aircraft squadrons of the Indian Navy
Naval units and formations of India